The common writhing skink (Mochlus laeviceps) is a species of skink found in Somalia and Ethiopia.

References

Mochlus
Reptiles described in 1874
Taxa named by Wilhelm Peters